The Swedish invasion of Saxony took place in 1706 during the Great Northern War, which began in 1700 when Russia, Denmark–Norway, and Saxony attacked Sweden or its ally, Holstein-Gottorp. To force Augustus II the Strong out of the war, who was the electorate of Saxony and king in the Polish–Lithuanian Commonwealth, Charles XII of Sweden invaded the Commonwealth; Augustus was dethroned in 1704, and, after a devastating Saxon defeat at Fraustadt, Charles marched against Saxony in 1706 with 20,000 men.

The supreme commander, Johann Matthias von der Schulenburg, deployed the best of his 16,000 Saxon troops in Lower Lusatia. Charles XII, however, surprised his foe and marched through Silesia into Upper Lusatia on 6 September. Schulenburg withdrew as a result. Augustus, with no hope of victory, began suing for peace. Meanwhile, Charles marched into Saxony and bypassed the strongly fortified Dresden, capturing Leipzig on 19 September. Several smaller engagements were fought, ending in Swedish favour. Charles established his headquarters at Altranstädt, and the field army under Schulenburg was driven out of Saxony in the engagements at Ilmenau and Frauenwald on 22 September. The Swedes blockaded Dresden, which compelled the Saxons to sign the Treaty of Altranstädt (1706) on 24 September; Augustus had to renounce all his claims to the Polish throne and recognize Stanisław Leszczyński as king.

In Saxony, Charles XII replenished his army and waited for the Grand Alliance, concurrently fighting the War of the Spanish Succession against France, to recognize the peace. A dispute between him and the Holy Roman Emperor, Joseph I, brought the two rulers to the brink of war. It was settled with the Treaty of Altranstädt (1707) on 1 September, with Joseph making concessions. Charles departed Altranstädt the same day to begin the campaign against his last enemy, Peter I of Russia.

Background

In 1700, the Great Northern War began when the anti-Swedish coalition, consisting of Frederick IV of Denmark, Peter I of Russia, and Augustus of Saxony and the Polish–Lithuanian Commonwealth, attacked Sweden and her ally Holstein-Gottorp. Denmark–Norway, besieging Tönning at the time, was quickly forced to sign a peace treaty following a Swedish landing at Humlebæk, combined with an offensive over the Bille. Russia's attack on Swedish Ingria and Swedish Estonia was subsequently repulsed in the Battle of Narva. The following year, Saxony's attempt at capturing Riga in Swedish Livonia ended with the successful Swedish Crossing of the Düna. As the Saxons retreated, Charles XII of Sweden launched an invasion of the Commonwealth to dethrone Augustus II.

In 1704, Augustus was dethroned in favour of Stanisław Leszczyński, who was illegally installed by the Swedes; his coronation followed in 1705, after which a treaty between Sweden and Poland was signed. Augustus, however, continued to resist the Swedes as the Elector of Saxony—Charles XII had refrained from invading Saxony to avoid provoking the Grand Alliance (fighting in the concurring War of the Spanish Succession), who were guarantors of its integrity. Tsar Peter I, who had thus far committed most of his troops in the Swedish Baltic provinces, sent his main army into the Commonwealth in support of Augustus.

A grand campaign commenced, which culminated in 1706 with the decisive defeat of the Saxon main army at Wschowa (Fraustadt), while the Russians were starved out and defeated at Grodno. With the Russian army battered, and the Saxon army destroyed, Charles XII seized the opportunity to invade the severely weakened Saxony before the Grand Alliance could intervene—his position in Poland would deteriorate if the French setbacks at Ramillies and Turin resulted in peace. By conquering Saxony, he would gain a position of power against the Alliance and a place to replenish his army before an inevitable Russian campaign.

Prelude
After the defeat against Carl Gustav Rehnskiöld at Fraustadt on 13 February 1706, Johann Matthias von der Schulenburg had only 1,800 Saxon cavalry, 3,800–3,900 Saxon infantry, as well as 1,500 Russian infantry left to defend the Electorate; he hoped to increase his Saxon infantry to 9,000–10,000 men before the expected Swedish invasion. Augustus, whose aim was to unite forces with Schulenburg, withdrew with 8,000 cavalry to Kraków after his defeat. When Rehnskiöld broke up from Poznań in early summer, Augustus, now with 10,000–15,000 men, retreated to Lithuania.

On 17 July 1706, since having pursued the Russians from Grodno, Charles XII led his army from Yaroslavychi (Rivne Oblast) towards Greater Poland. He rallied with pro-Leszczyński forces at Włodzimierzówka (Volyn Oblast), before crossing the Bug at Horodło on 21 July. He reached Chełm on 24 July, passed Łęczna on 27 July and crossed the Vistula at Puławy, before encamping at Radom on 3 August. He continued his march past Nowe Miasto on 10 August, to Rawa Mazowiecka the following day. Augustus, realizing Charles' intentions, opened up for negotiations on 16 August. The same day, Charles reached Stryków, where he established connection with Rhenskiöld's army from Piątek. Their combined forces counted at most 24,000 Swedes. They marched into Greater Poland and over Warta on 23–24 August, arriving at Rawicz near the border of neutral Silesia (belonging to the Holy Roman Empire) on 31 August. To protect Greater Poland, Charles left Arvid Axel Mardefelt with 4,350 men near Kalisz and one regiment in Poznań, and thousands of Polish pro-Leszczyński troops under Józef Potocki—only a small contingent followed Charles into Saxony.

Invasion

At the time of the invasion, the Saxon defence consisted of 9,000 infantry (of which 4,000 were garrisoned in Dresden), 2,000 cavalry and dragoons. There was also 5,000 land-militia and a few thousand experienced hunters, but their military training was considered inadequate. In total, there was at least 16,000 men of mixed quality. Schulenburg, anticipating a Swedish march through Lower Lusatia, assembled his regular troops there while most of the militia and hunters were sent to the garrisons in Dresden, Wittenberg, Leipzig with the Pleissenburg castle, and Königstein. Charles XII had roughly 250 of his own and Leszczyński's Drabants, 4,952 cavalry, 3,130 dragoons, 11,452 infantry, 200–500 Wallachian cavalry, and 50 despatch riders available for the invasion. In total, about 20,000 men. There were also 48 guns with 800 artillery gunners present (paper strength).

Charles marched his army towards Upper Lusatia, to the surprise of Schulenburg. The unusually dry season would contribute to a swift Swedish advance over the rivers. On 1 September, the army broke into Silesia in two columns under Charles XII and Rehnskiöld. Charles rode in the vanguard, alongside his Drabant Corps and the  Wallachians. He marched from Rawicz, through Wąsosz (Herrnstadt) and Krzelów (Krehlau), where the columns converged, to the Oder. An enemy outpost withdrew as Charles crossed the river at dawn the next day, marching through Ścinawa (Steinau) to Dąbrowa Środkowa (Mittel Dammer). On 3 September, he marched through Lubin (Lüben), past Chojnów (Haynau), to Piotrowice (Petirsdorf). The following day, he went past Grodziec Castle (Gröditzberg) on his left to Brunów (Braunau). On 5 September, he arrived at Oleszna Podgórska (Krummöls) via Lwówek Śląski (Löwenberg).

Fruitless attempts were made by the ministers of Dresden to stop the Swedish advance by seeking the intervention of the Grand Alliance. Fearing pillaging, many Saxon inhabitants panicked at the news of the approaching Swedes. Charles XII, however, issued letters of protection from Oleszna Podgórska on 5 September, declaring that no pillaging would occur as long as the inhabitants remained cooperative. To save his Electorate from destruction, Augustus encouraged the inhabitants to comply with Charles—most of them would open their doors to the invaders as a result.

On 5 September, Charles arrived at the border town of Gryfów Śląski (Greiffenberg), where he received a trumpeter sent by Augustus to convince him not to advance further. The vanguard, however, crossed the border the same day. On 6 September, Charles crossed it by going over the Kwisa river (Queis) to Sulików (Schönberg), into Upper Lusatia.

Combat of Rosenhain
Upon realising the direction of the invading Swedes, Schulenburg ordered major general Jordan into Upper Lusatia to observe their movements and to overwhelm Charles XII and his vanguard if possible. His force consisted of Fürstenberg's and his own dragoon regiments, totalling 600–700 men. Against them, Charles sent Colonel Görtz, who had previously been in Saxon service, with 250 men of the Life Dragoon Regiment and the Scanian Estate Dragoons, as well as 50 Wallachians. At the dawn of 7 September, Görtz found Jordan in an advantageous position behind a river, near Rosenhain and Radmeritz (between Löbau and Reichenbach).

A squadron of the Swedish Life Regiment Dragoons charged over the bridge into the closest Saxon troops who were forming into battle, causing disorder. As Jordan attempted to restore order, he was recognized by Görtz, who chased after him among the fleeing troops and pierced him twice with his sword. Meanwhile, the rest of the Swedish force crossed the river and attacked, forcing the Saxons to retreat along the whole front; some fled to Bohemia, while most fled west over the Elbe river.

The Saxons left 94 or 96 men dead on the battlefield, with three banners and 36 men captured. Many more were killed during the pursuit which extended for several miles; according to a list of casualties from Dresden, the Saxons had lost one captain, five lieutenants and second lieutenants, and 223 dragoons, with 80 men wounded. Their commander, Jordan, died of his wounds the following day. The Swedes had two men killed and seven wounded, among them the captain of the Life Dragoons who was mortally wounded. The Swedes gained several wagons of supplies and armaments which were meant for Dresden, as well as various fine horses. Schulenburg, having retreated west of the Elbe river, pulled his forces into the cities.

Capture of Leipzig

On 8 September, Charles XII marched past Görlitz to Markersdorf, towards Dresden. He went through Reichenbach to Kubschütz the following day. On 11 September, he bypassed Bautzen to Bischofswerda, where Augustus' Privy councillor Imhoff and Privy referendary Pfingsten arrived from Dresden to negotiate. Charles left negotiations to his ministers, Carl Piper and Olof Hermelin, and marched past Stolpen to Radeberg on 12 September. The next day, he sent Johan August Meijerfeldt southeast of Dresden, to Sonnenstein Castle at Pirna, while he bypassed Dresden to the north, now heading for Leipzig with its 1,600-man garrison. He arrived at Weinböhla on 14 September and crossed the Elbe river at Meissen the following day. The garrisons in Leipzig and Wittenberg evacuated, as the Saxon ministry commended Schulenburg to retreat with the army. On 17 September, Charles marched through Lommatzsch, Mügeln, over the Mulde river, to Grimma, where he received reports that Schulenburg's army was nearby. It consisted of 2,800 infantry, including 1,200 Russians, and 1,800 cavalry.

Charles XII sent Görtz with the vanguard of 950 cavalry and dragoons and the Wallachians to attack it, while he followed behind. The main Swedish army proceeded to Leipzig. Schulenburg, retreating towards Thuringian Forest (Thüringer Wald) via Weimar and Erfurt—to save his army into the Holy Roman Empire—was caught in a rearguard action at Weissenfels on September 19. The Wallachians killed 20–30 Saxons and captured 36 more, but lost their colonel. Near Naumburg, Charles ordered Görtz to keep pursuing while he departed for the main army. Another rearguard action was fought at Liebstedt, with more prisoners taken.

The Swedish army marched through Naunhof to Taucha the same day, from where Axel Gyllenkrok with an escort of 50 dragoons continued to Leipzig. The city opened its gates, except for the Pleissenburg castle with its 200–300 militia. They were made prisoners of war when a Saxon courier arrived from Dresden with orders to stop resisting. When Charles arrived the next day, he freed the prisoners and established headquarters at Altranstädt. To pressurise the Saxon negotiators, he despatched orders for Meijerfeldt to initiate a proper blockade of Dresden. This compelled Imhoff and Pfingsten, who deliberately stalled the negotiations in hope of allied intervention, to sign the confidential Treaty of Altranstädt (1706) on 24 September. Two days later, a ceasefire was put into effect for 10 weeks, awaiting Augustus' ratification; Meijerfeldt was ordered to lift the blockade of Dresden, while a Swedish force marched to seize the undefended Wittenberg.

Combat of Frauenwald

On September 18, the Saxon vanguard reached Erfurt but was denied entrance, as the city feared Swedish reprisals. By nightfall on 20 September, Schulenburg's army assembled near Ilmenau. It counted 6,000 men after unifying with additional troops. On early morning the next day, the retreat continued towards Frauenwald. The Saxon vanguard reached Coburg the same day. On dawn of 22 September, Görtz arrived at Ilmenau and attacked the remaining field guards. Many Russians were killed or captured as they were chased into the Thuringian Forest, scattered into smaller groups.

Görtz then continued towards Frauenwald in pursuit of the Saxon rearguard. Its commander, Ludwig von Dünewald, barricaded 2,000 Saxons at Frauenwalder Pass, on the Meisen Hill (789 metres north of Frauenwald), to hold him off. He also sent a Swiss battalion of 500 men towards Neustadter Pass, a few kilometres to the east, to secure his flank. Later in the morning, Görtz ordered 150 dragoons on foot to storm Frauenwalder Pass. They were repulsed after hours of fighting with many dead and wounded. He then commanded half his force through the Neustadter Pass to circumvent Dünewald, leaving Jöran Adlerberg with the rest to skirmish in his front.

Almost an hour later, in the early afternoon, Görtz stumbled upon the Swiss battalion in full march near Gießübel (Schleusegrund). He launched a mounted attack through the forest with no success. The Swiss established a solid defence, forcing the Swedes to dismount their horses to attack. They advanced in the cover of the trees but were initially unable to dislodge the enemy. A request to surrender by Görtz was refused. He then sent Ryttmästare Törnflycht to attack their rear, and prepared cavalry in the front. After an hour of fighting, the Swiss, attacked from all sides and with their commanding-officer wounded, threw down their arms and fled. Darkness prevented Görtz from pursuing much further. He sent orders for Adlerberg to rendezvous with him at Ilmenau. The Saxon army broke up into companies, with some retreating towards Franconia, others towards Coburg and Bayreuth, while the battered Russians fled towards the Bohemian Forest. Most of their baggage was abandoned.

The Swedes reported a total loss of about 50 men, including three officers killed, and two officers with 37 lower ranks wounded. Other reports of Swedish casualties ranges from 20, to two officers killed, four wounded, and 150 lower ranks killed and wounded.

News from Erfurt mentions 100 killed Russians near Ilmenau, and Swedish reports claim 30 captured. The reports also state that at least 80 enemies were killed at Frauenwalder Pass and Gießübel, and 47 captured, including one major and ten officers. In total, at least 100 captured and 130 killed since Ilmenau. No Saxon casualty reports exist, however, civilians estimate them to at least 18 killed and 50–60 captured at Gießübel. An additional 60 wounded is plausible.

Aftermath

Negotiations leading up to the Treaty of Altranstädt had been conducted in secret, according to the wishes of both rulers; Charles XII wanted to avoid foreign interference, while Augustus, remaining in the Commonwealth with his Russian allies, feared how they would react to such news. Accordingly, among other things, Augustus were to renounce all his claims to the Polish throne, recognize Leszczyński as king, and abandon the anti-Swedish coalition; James Louis Sobieski, the former pro-Swedish candidate to the throne, and his brother were to be freed from Saxon imprisonment; the Swedish traitor Johann Patkul and the Russians in Augustus' command were to be handed over to the Swedes; the Swedish army would be supplied with winter quarters in Saxony. The occupation would cost Saxony 35 million Reichsthaler.

Occupation of Saxony
The estates in Saxony were forced to pay large contributions, while the Swedish regiments were spread out in several towns and cities all around Altranstädt. The army was replenished with new recruits, mainly from Sweden but also Silesia. Its stay in Saxony remained mostly peaceful; some early atrocities were committed, especially by the Wallachians and other Poles, which obliged Charles to issue strict disciplinary mandates to his troops.

On 20 October, Augustus despatched letters from Pietrykaw, Lithuania, in which he finally ratified the treaty in secrecy. On 29 October, however, while trying to hide his intentions from the Russians, he was drawn into a battle against Mardefelt's Swedish–Polish corps at Kalisz, which was destroyed. Charles XII, furious over these news, published the treaty on 26 November and demanded the release of the Swedish prisoners. Augustus then rode to Saxony, where the two rulers met for the first time on 17 December, at Günthersdorf. A new force of 8,000 men under Ernst Detlof von Krassow was sent into Greater Poland to protect it against the Russians.

Augustus had fulfilled most of the significant peace terms by the end of March 1707, apart from handing over the Russians. Before leaving Saxony, Charles XII called upon the Grand Alliance to recognize both the treaty and Leszczyński as the new king of Poland. The occupation gave him a certain power position, since the Alliance had to commit troops to the Saxon border which restrained their war efforts against France. In 1707, Prussia and Hannover, followed by the Holy Roman Emperor Joseph I and several minor German princes, recognized Leszczyński. 

A dispute between Charles XII and Joseph I soon arose, mainly concerning the Russians who had fled into Joseph's territory; Charles demanded their hand-over, according to the Treaty of Altranstädt. To avoid provoking the Tsar, Joseph secretly gave the Russians passports and instructed them to flee, before staging a fruitless cavalry pursuit. Charles, not fooled by the stunt, expelled Joseph's ministers at Altranstädt in response. The growing disaffection between the two rulers brought them to the brink of war; Joseph attempted to create a new anti-Swedish coalition, while Charles signed a defence pact with Frederick I of Prussia on 16 August.

The situation was resolved with the Treaty of Altranstädt (1707) on 1 September, as Joseph I's allies persuaded him into making concessions to speed up Charles XII's departure from Saxony. The Protestants in Silesia had their rights restored according to the Peace of Westphalia—it was a compensation for Joseph's failure to hand over the Russians. Furthermore, Charles was promised that England and the Dutch Republic would recognize the previous treaty. Charles departed Altranstädt the same day, with an army that was well-rested and larger than ever before. The Russian campaign ended with its destruction in the Battle of Poltava and the subsequent Swedish Surrender at Perevolochna.

Engagements

See also
 Swedish invasion of Poland (1701–1706)
 Swedish invasion of Russia

Notes

References

Sources

Great Northern War
Wars involving Saxony
Wars involving Sweden
Invasions by Sweden
18th century in Saxony
Charles XII of Sweden